Waltheria virgata is a species of flowering plant in the mallow family, Malvaceae, that is found in the north of Western Australia, and in the Northern Territory.

Description
Waltheria virgata is an erect, much branched shrub growing from a height of 0.3 m to 1 m high, and up to 1 m wide.  Its leaves and stems are thinly to densely covered in stellate (star-shaped) hairs. Its pink-purple flowers may be seen from April to May or July to October.

Habitat
It grows on red sand and stony soils, on plains, on rocky hills, and in stony creeks.

Taxonomy and naming 
It was first described in 1917 by Alfred James Ewart & Isabel Clifton Cookson. There are no synonyms. The specific epithet, virgata, derives from the Latin word, virga,  "a rod for beating", to give a Botanical Latin adjective describing the plant as having "straight slender not very flexible twigs". The genus name, Waltheria,  honours the German botanist Augustin Friedrich Walther.

References

External links
Waltheria virgata occurrence data from the Australasian Virtual Herbarium

Byttnerioideae
Eudicots of Western Australia
Flora of the Northern Territory
Plants described in 1917